Gong Yinbing (1896 – 26 June 1976) was a Chinese banker and politician. He was a representative of the 6th and 18th National Congress of the Communist Party of China. He was a delegate to the 1st National People's Congress and the 2nd and 3rd Standing Committee of the National People's Congress. He a member of the 2rd National Committee of the Chinese People's Political Consultative Conference the 3rd Standing Committee of the Chinese People's Political Consultative Conference.

Biography
Gong was born into a landlord family in Changsha County, Hunan, in 1896. He graduated from Hunan University.
After the 1911 Revolution, he joined the Kuomintang and took part in the struggle against Yuan Shikai and the Constitutional Protection Movement.

Influenced by communism during the May Fourth Movement, he joined the Communist Party of China in 1923. He mainly engaged in propaganda, intelligence and financial work secretly in Changsha, Wuhan, Shanghai, Jinan, Chongqing, and British Hong Kong. After Shanghai was controlled by the People's Liberation Army in May 1949, he was appointed as a member of the Financial Takeover Committee of the Shanghai Military Control Commission and general manager of the Bank of China.

After the establishment of the Communist State in 1949, he successively served as vice minister of light industry and deputy head of United Front Work Department. During the Cultural Revolution, he was brought to be persecuted and suffered political persecution.

On 26 June 1976, he died from an illness in Beijing, aged 80.

Family
His son Gong Yuzhi was a Chinese Communist Party theorist and politician. His grandson Gong Ke is an electronic engineer and administrator who served as president of Tianjin University from 2006 to 2011 and president of Nankai University from 2011 to 2018.

References

1896 births
1976 deaths
People from Changsha County
Hunan University alumni
Chinese bankers
People's Republic of China politicians from Hunan
Chinese Communist Party politicians from Hunan
Members of the 2nd Chinese People's Political Consultative Conference
Members of the Standing Committee of the 3rd Chinese People's Political Consultative Conference
Delegates to the 1st National People's Congress
Delegates to the 2nd National People's Congress